is a Japanese politician of the Constitutional Democratic Party of Japan and a member of the House of Representatives in the Diet (national legislature).

Biography 
A native of Shibetsu, Hokkaidō and high school graduate, he was elected to the House of Representatives for the first time in 2005 after having served in the assembly of Hokkaidō for five terms.

References

External links 
 Official website in Japanese.

1949 births
Living people
Politicians from Hokkaido
Members of the Hokkaido Prefectural Assembly
Members of the House of Representatives (Japan)
Constitutional Democratic Party of Japan politicians
Democratic Party of Japan politicians
21st-century Japanese politicians
20th-century Japanese people